Non Stop is a Julio Iglesias studio album released in 1988. The song "My Love", a duet with Stevie Wonder, reached No. 80 on the Billboard Hot 100 and No. 14 on the Adult Contemporary chart. In the UK, it reached No. 5, returning Iglesias to the top five there for the first time in six years. The album was certified gold in the United States by the RIAA.

Track listing

Certifications

References

1988 albums
Julio Iglesias albums
Albums produced by Humberto Gatica
Columbia Records albums
Albums produced by Stevie Wonder
Albums recorded at United Western Recorders
Albums recorded at Sunset Sound Recorders